The 2010 Tour of Britain was a UCI 2.1 category race of eight stages that was held from 11 to 18 September 2010. The race was the seventh edition of the latest version of the Tour of Britain and the 71st British tour in total. It formed part of the 2009–2010 UCI Europe Tour. The race began in Rochdale and ended with a circuit stage in London. The Tour was won by a  rider for the second successive year, as Switzerland's Michael Albasini won the race by over a minute.

Participating teams

UCI ProTour Teams
 GRM – 
 THR – 
 SAX – 
 SKY – 

UCI Professional Continental Teams
 CSF – 
 CTT – 
 SKS – 
 TSV – 
 ISD – 
 VAC – 

UCI Continental Teams
 SKT – 
 EDR – Endura Racing
 MPT – 
 RAL – 
 RCS – 
 SGS – 

 Other Teams
 IRE – Ireland National Team

Stages

Stage 1
11 September 2010 – Rochdale to Blackpool,

Stage 2
12 September 2010 – Stoke-on-Trent,

Stage 3
13 September 2010 – Newtown to Swansea,

Stage 4
14 September 2010 – Minehead to Teignmouth, 171 km

Stage 5
15 September 2010 – Tavistock to Glastonbury,

Stage 6
16 September 2010 – King's Lynn to Great Yarmouth,

Stage 7
17 September 2010 – Bury St Edmunds to Colchester,

Stage 8
18 September 2010 – London, 
The final stage of the 2010 edition was a circuit race in Newham, London. It was originally intended that the final stage would be in the centre of London but, due to the visit of Pope Benedict XVI to London, the organisers were forced to find an alternative location.

Classification leadership

References

External links

 Official Website

2010
Tour of Britain
2010 in British sport
September 2010 sports events in the United Kingdom
2010 sports events in London